Zsolt Vereczkei (born 22 February 1977) is a Hungarian backstroke Paralympic swimmer and former world record holder.

He was awarded the Order of Merit of the Republic of Hungary in 2016 and the Halassy Olivér Prize from the Hungarian Paralympic Committee for his services to Paralympic sports.

References

1977 births
Living people
People from Nyírbátor
People from Baja, Hungary
Paralympic swimmers of Hungary
Swimmers at the 1992 Summer Paralympics
Swimmers at the 1996 Summer Paralympics
Swimmers at the 2000 Summer Paralympics
Swimmers at the 2004 Summer Paralympics
Swimmers at the 2008 Summer Paralympics
Swimmers at the 2012 Summer Paralympics
Swimmers at the 2016 Summer Paralympics
Medalists at the 1992 Summer Paralympics
Medalists at the 1996 Summer Paralympics
Medalists at the 2000 Summer Paralympics
Medalists at the 2004 Summer Paralympics
Medalists at the 2008 Summer Paralympics
Medalists at the 2012 Summer Paralympics
Medalists at the 2016 Summer Paralympics
Paralympic medalists in swimming
Paralympic gold medalists for Hungary
Paralympic bronze medalists for Hungary
Hungarian male swimmers
Medalists at the World Para Swimming Championships
S5-classified Paralympic swimmers
Male backstroke swimmers
Sportspeople from Szabolcs-Szatmár-Bereg County
Sportspeople from Bács-Kiskun County